Tuberous morning glory can refer to these plants:

 Ipomoea batatas or sweet potato
 Merremia tuberosa or Spanish arborvine